Stotz is a surname. Notable people with the name will include:

Carl E. Stotz (1910–1992) American founder of Little League Baseball
Karl Stotz (1927–2017) Austrian football player from Vienna
Charles Morse Stotz (1898–1985), architect, architectural historian and preservationist
Max Stotz (1912–1943) German Luftwaffe flying ace 
The Carl E. Stotz Memorial Little League Bridge, formerly known as the Market Street Bridge, carries approximately 27,700 vehicles a day on U.S. Route 15
Edward Stotz, Sr (1868–1948), American architect based in the city of Pittsburgh
Eva Stotz (born 1979), German documentary film maker and director 
Andrew Stotz, CFA is the current President of the CFA Society Thailand and is one of Thailand’s award-winning equity analysts. 
Kent Stotz (born 1958),  American motorcycle racer.